Angelo Arcidiacono (25 September 1955 – 26 February 2007) was an Italian fencer. He won a silver medal in the team sabre event at the 1976 Summer Olympics and a gold in the same event at the 1984 Summer Olympics.

References

External links
 
 
 
 

1955 births
2007 deaths
Italian male fencers
Olympic fencers of Italy
Fencers at the 1976 Summer Olympics
Fencers at the 1984 Summer Olympics
Olympic gold medalists for Italy
Olympic silver medalists for Italy
Olympic medalists in fencing
Sportspeople from Catania
Medalists at the 1976 Summer Olympics
Medalists at the 1984 Summer Olympics
Universiade medalists in fencing
Universiade silver medalists for Italy
Medalists at the 1977 Summer Universiade